Raymond Preston (born January 25, 1954) is an American former professional football player who was a linebacker for nine years (1976–1984) with the San Diego Chargers of the National Football League (NFL).  Preston played college football at Syracuse University, where he earned All-American honors in 1975 and was a team captain. He was drafted in the eleventh round of the 1976 NFL Draft by the Chargers.

His son, Duke Preston, was an offensive lineman for the Dallas Cowboys.

References

1954 births
Living people
American football linebackers
Syracuse Orange football players
San Diego Chargers players
Sportspeople from Lawrence, Massachusetts